The 1984 Idaho Vandals football team represented the University of Idaho in the 1984 NCAA Division I-AA football season. The Vandals, led by third-year head coach Dennis Erickson, were members of the Big Sky Conference and played their home games at the Kibbie Dome, an indoor facility on campus in Moscow, Idaho.

After the departure of four-year starter QB Ken Hobart following the 1983 season, Idaho struggled with injuries and inexperience, falling to a 2–5 record before winning their last four.

Although the 1984 season was less successful than the previous two, it marked the first time in nearly eight decades that the Vandals had three consecutive winning seasons in football; it was last accomplished in 1905.

Erickson's 23 wins in three seasons made him the winningest head coach in Vandal history,  and he added nine more the next year. Defensive coordinator John L. Smith became the Vandals' head coach in 1989 and posted 53 wins in six seasons.

Notable games
The Vandals defeated Oregon State of the Pac-10  in Moscow, but lost to upstart independent Eastern Washington in Spokane in the inaugural Governors' Cup, (EWU joined the Big Sky in 1987). Nevada continued its dominance over the Vandals, winning its sixth straight since joining the conference in 1979. Double-digit leads in the second half were squandered in both disappointing home losses to Montana State and Weber State.

Idaho defeated rival Boise State for the third consecutive year, a streak that extended to twelve straight in 1993. The 1984 game was the most lopsided to date, with the Vandals recording a  shutout on the road at Bronco Stadium in the season finale. In its seventeen years competing as a four-year school, Boise State had neither been shut out nor lost by more than 35 points. Senior Tim McMonigle wrapped up his third year as placekicker with thirteen points (3 FG, 4 PAT) to become the Vandals' all-time leading scorer at 224 points, passing 1960s fullback Ray McDonald.

Division I-AA playoffs
Idaho missed the I-AA playoffs again, but returned in ten of the next eleven seasons, then departed for the Big West Conference after the 1995 season. The Bobcats were the only selection from the West in the 12-team playoffs. Idaho closed out the decade with conference titles in 1985, 1987, 1988, and 1989 (and runner-up in 1986), not missing the I-AA playoffs until 1991.

Notable players
The 1984 team included two future NFL head coaches: quarterback Scott Linehan and offensive lineman Tom Cable.

Schedule

Roster

All-conference
Wide receiver Eric Yarber, center Matt Watson, and cornerback Calvin Loveall were named to the Big Sky all-conference  Vandals on the second team were guard Lance West, tight end Scott Auker, running back Mike Shill, defensive end Sam Manoa, and placekicker Tim McMonigle.

References

External links
Gem of the Mountains: 1985 University of Idaho yearbook – 1984 football season
Idaho Argonaut – student newspaper – 1984  editions

Idaho
Idaho Vandals football seasons
Idaho Vandals football